The Söderskär lighthouse (Finnish: Söderskärin majakka, Swedish: Söderskär fyr) is a decommissioned 19th-century lighthouse in the outer Porvoo archipelago of the Gulf of Finland. It was built in 1862, replacing an earlier unilluminated daymark, automated in 1957, and decommissioned in 1989.

The lighthouse is situated on a small islet, known as Majakkasaari ( 'Lighthouse Island'). Connected to it by a footbridge is another islet, Luotsisaari ('Pilot Island'), where a pilot station was based since before the construction of the current lighthouse. Three lighthouse keepers, with their families, and on-duty pilots used to reside on the islets, until the lighthouse was automated.

The lighthouse was designed by architect Ernst Lohrmann. The tower is octagonal in shape, and comprises six storeys. In the early years of the 20th century it was discovered that the tower swayed in strong wind, and was also leaning to one side; consequently, in 1914-1917 a steel and concrete 'girdle' was added to stabilise the structure.

The light is equipped with a Fresnel lens, and when commissioned, Söderskär was renowned for its exceptionally bright and long-range light.

The lighthouse itself is now privately owned, having been sold by the government in 2003. The building is protected by the Finnish Heritage Agency, meaning that no exterior or interior alterations are allowed, and the technical equipment may not be removed without permission.

Tove Jansson is said to have used Söderskär as a model when writing the lighthouse island of the book Moominpappa at Sea.

References

Lighthouses in Finland
Lighthouses completed in 1862
Ernst Lohrmann buildings
Water transport in Finland
Buildings and structures in Porvoo